This is a list of Spanish television related events in 2004.

Events 
 11 March: News programs in every channel covering the 2004 Madrid train bombings.
 23 April: Carmen Caffarel is appointed General Director of RTVE.
 27 April:  Fran Llorente is appointed News Service Director of TVE, replacing Alfredo Urdaci.
 22 May: Broadcasting of the Prince Felipe and Letizia Ortiz wedding with more tan 25 million viewers.
 24 June: Telecinco puts on the Stock Exchange 34,59% of its share.
20 November: María Isabel, wins the Junior Eurovision Song Contest 2004 with the song Antes muerta que sencilla.
 9 December: The Self-Regulation Code on Television Content and Children is signed.

Debuts

Television shows

Ending this year

Changes of network affiliation

Foreign series debuts in Spain

Births 
 4 February - Fernando Boza, actor
 5 February - Paula Gallego, actress

Deaths 
 5 January - Pepe Carroll, magician and y host, 46.
 21 January - Luis Cuenca, actor, 82.
 7 February - Margarita Landi, journalist, 85.
 15 May - Narciso Ibáñez Menta, actor, 91.
 8 June - Nuria Torray, actress, 69.
 5 July - José de las Casas, journalist, Director de TVE (1968-1970), 78.
 28 August - Mercedes Vecino, actress, 88.
 8 September - Matías Prats Cañete, journalist, 90.
 16 November - Joan Ramón Mainat, producer, 53.
 31 December - Raúl Matas, host, 83.

See also
2004 in Spain
List of Spanish films of 2004

References 

2004 in Spanish television